Meximieux—Pérouges station (French: Gare de Meximieux—Pérouges) is a railway station located in the commune of Meximieux, Ain department in the Auvergne-Rhône-Alpes region of France. As its name suggests the station is located within proximity of, and serves the nearby medieval era commune of Pérouges. It is located at kilometric point (KP) 38.393 on the Lyon–Geneva railway, between the stations of La Valbonne and Ambérieu-en-Bugey.

As of 2020, the station is owned and operated by the SNCF and served by TER Auvergne-Rhône-Alpes trains.

History 
The section of the Lyon—Geneva railway between Lyon and Ambérieu via Miribel was opened on 23 June 1856.

In 2019, the SNCF estimated that 719,403 passengers traveled through the station.

Services

Passenger services 
Owned and operated by the SNCF, the station is equipped with automatic ticket dispensing machines.

Train services 
As of 2021, the station is served by the following services:

 Regional services (TER Auvergne-Rhône-Alpes 35) Chambéry ... Culoz ... Ambérieu ... Lyon.

Intermodality 
In addition to a parking lot for passengers, the station is equipped with secure bicycle storage facilities.

See also 

 List of SNCF stations in Auvergne-Rhône-Alpes

References 

Railway stations in Ain
Lyon–Geneva railway